Telebasis salva, the desert firetail, is a species of narrow-winged damselfly in the family Coenagrionidae. It is found in Central America, North America, and South America.

The IUCN conservation status of Telebasis salva is "LC", least concern, with no immediate threat to the species' survival. The population is stable. The IUCN status was reviewed in 2018.

References

Further reading

External links

 

Coenagrionidae
Articles created by Qbugbot
Insects described in 1861